In mathematics, Dedekind sums are certain sums of products of a sawtooth function, and are given by a function D of three integer variables.  Dedekind introduced them to express the functional equation of the Dedekind eta function. They have subsequently been much studied in number theory, and have occurred in some problems of topology. Dedekind sums have a large number of functional equations; this article lists only a small fraction of these.

Dedekind sums were introduced by Richard Dedekind in a commentary on fragment XXVIII of Bernhard Riemann's collected papers.

Definition 
Define the sawtooth function  as  

We then let

be defined by

the terms on the right being the Dedekind sums. For the case a = 1, one often writes

s(b, c) = D(1, b; c).

Simple formulae
Note that D is symmetric in a and b, and hence

and that, by the oddness of (( )),

D(−a, b; c) = −D(a, b; c),

D(a, b; −c) = D(a, b; c).

By the periodicity of D in its first two arguments, the third argument being the length of the period for both,

D(a, b; c) = D(a+kc, b+lc; c), for all integers k,l.

If d is a positive integer, then

D(ad, bd; cd) = dD(a, b; c),

D(ad, bd; c) = D(a, b; c), if (d, c) = 1,

D(ad, b; cd) = D(a, b; c), if (d, b) = 1.

There is a proof for the last equality making use of

Furthermore, az = 1 (mod c) implies D(a, b; c) = D(1, bz; c).

Alternative forms

If b and c are coprime, we may write s(b, c) as

If b, c > 0 are coprime, then

Reciprocity law
If b and c are coprime positive integers then

Rewriting this as

it follows that the number 6c s(b,c) is an integer.

If k = (3, c) then

and

A relation that is prominent in the theory of the Dedekind eta function is the following. Let q = 3, 5, 7 or 13 and let n = 24/(q − 1). Then given integers a, b, c, d with ad − bc = 1 (thus belonging to the modular group), with c chosen so that c = kq for some integer k > 0, define
 

Then nδ is an even integer.

Rademacher's generalization of the reciprocity law
Hans Rademacher found the following generalization of the reciprocity law for Dedekind sums:  If a, b, and c are pairwise coprime positive integers, then

Hence, the above triple sum vanishes if and only if (a, b, c) is a Markov triple, i.e. a solution of the Markov equation

References

Further reading
 Tom M. Apostol, Modular functions and Dirichlet Series in Number Theory (1990), Springer-Verlag, New York.  (See chapter 3.)
 Matthias Beck and Sinai Robins, Dedekind sums: a discrete geometric viewpoint, (2005 or earlier)  
 Hans Rademacher and Emil Grosswald, Dedekind Sums, Carus Math. Monographs, 1972.  .

Number theory
Modular forms